The 2005–06 SIJHL season is the 5th season of the Superior International Junior Hockey League (SIJHL). The six teams of the SIJHL played 52-game schedules, except for Minot State University-Bottineau who played a 20-game season.

In February 2006, the top teams of the league played down for the Bill Salonen Cup, the SIJHL championship.  The winner of the Bill Salonen Cup competed in the Central Canadian Junior "A" championship, the Dudley Hewitt Cup.  If successful against the winners of the Ontario Junior Hockey League and Northern Ontario Junior Hockey League, the champion would have then moved on to play in the Canadian Junior Hockey League championship, the 2006 Royal Bank Cup.

Changes 
Schreiber Diesels join league.
Minot State University-Bottineau Lumberjacks join league on part-time basis.
Fort Frances Borderland Thunder leave league.

Final standings
Note: GP = Games played; W = Wins; L = Losses; OTL = Overtime losses; SL = Shootout losses; GF = Goals for; GA = Goals against; PTS = Points; x = clinched playoff berth; y = clinched division title; z = clinched conference title

Teams listed on the official league website.

Standings listed on official league website.

2005-06 Bill Salonen Cup Playoffs

Playoff results are listed on the official league website.

Dudley Hewitt Cup Championship
Hosted by the Fort William North Stars in Thunder Bay, Ontario.  Fort William finished won the tournament, Dryden finished in third.

Round Robin
Dryden Ice Dogs 3 - St. Michael's Buzzers (OPJHL) 2
Fort William North Stars 6 - Sudbury Jr. Wolves (NOJHL) 1
Sudbury Jr. Wolves (NOJHL) 6 - Dryden Ice Dogs 1
St. Michael's Buzzers (OPJHL) 7 - Fort William North Stars 1
Fort William North Stars 3 - Dryden Ice Dogs 0

Semi-final
Sudbury Jr. Wolves (NOJHL) 5 - Dryden Ice Dogs 4

Final
Fort William North Stars 7 - Sudbury Jr. Wolves (NOJHL) 6 OT

2006 Royal Bank Cup Championship
Hosted by the Streetsville Derbys in Brampton, Ontario.  Fort William finished third in the round robin and was eliminated in the semi-final.

Round Robin
Streetsville Derbys (OPJHL) 3 - Fort William North Stars 2
Fort William North Stars 4 - Joliette Action (QJAAAHL) 3 2OT
Burnaby Express (BCHL) 3 - Fort William North Stars 2
Fort William North Stars 2 - Yorkton Terriers (SJHL) 1

Semi-final
Burnaby Express (BCHL) 3 - Fort William North Stars 2 OT

Scoring leaders 
Note: GP = Games played; G = Goals; A = Assists; Pts = Points; PIM = Penalty minutes

Leading goaltenders 
Note: GP = Games played; Mins = Minutes played; W = Wins; L = Losses: OTL = Overtime losses; SL = Shootout losses; GA = Goals Allowed; SO = Shutouts; GAA = Goals against average

Awards
Most Valuable Player -
Most Improved Player -
Rookie of the Year -
Top Defenceman -
Top Defensive Forward -
Most Gentlemanly Player -
Top Goaltender -
Coach of the Year -
Top Scorer Award -
Top Executive -

See also 
 2006 Royal Bank Cup
 Dudley Hewitt Cup

References

External links 
 Official website of the Superior International Junior Hockey League
 Official website of the Canadian Junior Hockey League

Superior International Junior Hockey League seasons
SIJHL